This is a list of premiership winners in the Tasmanian Football League.

TFL Grand Finals (1879–present) 
Below is the complete list of champions since the first edition held by then "Tasmanian Football Association" (TFA) in 1879.

Notes

Premiers by club

Notes

Other competitions

Tasmanian State Premiers 

The Tasmanian State Premiership took place between the reigning TFL/TANFL premier, the premier from the Northern Tasmanian Football Association and from 1954, the premier of the North West Football Union.

Winfield Statewide Cup 
The 1980 Winfield Statewide Cup was a round-robin statewide tournament that took place between the top 21 clubs in Tasmania from the TANFL, the NTFA and the NWFU.

References

Australian rules football-related lists
Australian rules football records and statistics
Premierships 
Australian rules football awards